Hla Htwe is the speaker of the Kayah State Hluttaw. He was elected as an MP from Shadaw Township constituency No. 2 in Kayah State in 2015 and became speaker on 8 February 2016.

References

1954 births
Living people